Clemence, or Clémence, is a name. It may refer to:

 Louise Michel (1830-1905), a French anarchist who used Clémence as a pseudonym

Given name
 Clémence d'Aquitaine (1060–1142)
 Clemence of Austria (1262–1293 or 1295)
 Clemence of Hungary, queen of France and Navarre 
 Clemence B. Horrall (1895–1960), Los Angeles Police Chief 
 Clémence Beikes, French basketball player
 Clémence Calvin, French runner 
 Clemence Dane, English novelist and playwright 
 Clémence DesRochers, Canadian performer
 Clémence de Grandval (1828–1907), French composer
 Clémence Grimal, French snowboarder
 Clémence Guetté (born 1991), French politician
 Clemence Housman, English women's rights activist
 Clémence Isaure, mythic patron of Toulousain poetry
 Clémence Matutu, Congolese handball player
 Clémence Ollivier, French rugby union player 
 Clémence Poésy, French actress and model 
 Clémence Ross-van Dorp, Dutch politician
 Clémence Saint-Preux, French singer
 Clemence Sophia Harned Lozier, American physician

Family name
 Chris Clemence (1986–), bassist of the band RapScallions
 George H. Clemence, American architect 
 Gerald Maurice Clemence (1908–1974), American astronomer
 Ray Clemence (1948–), English football goalkeeper
 Sacha Clémence, English footballer
 Stephen Clemence, English footballer

See also
Clemencia (name), list of the people 

Feminine given names
English-language feminine given names
French feminine given names